America Undercover is a series of documentaries that aired on the cable television network HBO from 1983 through 2006.  Within the series are several sub-series, such as Autopsy, Real Sex, and Taxicab Confessions.

History
The series began in 1984 and, after a brief time being broadcast weekly in 2001, was later broadcast once per month. In 2006, episodes began being rebroadcast on A&E Network.

Over the years, episodes have covered numerous subjects such as abortion, organized crime, and pedophilia. The show won several awards for the 1998 production of Strippers: The Naked Stages.

Episodes
Hooker (1983) - Directed by Robert Niemack
When Women Kill (1983) - Directed by Lee Grant
The Nightmare of Cocaine (1984) - Directed by Fleming B. Fuller
Toxic Time Bomb: The Fight Against Deadly Pollution (1984) - Directed by August Cinquegrana
Acts of Violence (1985) - Directed by Imre Horvath
UFO's: What's Going On? (1985) - Directed by Robert Guenette
The Gift of Life (1986) - Directed by Bill Couturié
And the Pursuit of Happiness (1986) - Directed by Louis Malle
Kids in Crisis (1986) - Directed by Robert Niemack
Kids in Sports: The Price of Glory (1986) - Directed by Dennis Lofgren
Surveillance: No Place to Hide  (1986) - Directed by Joseph Angier
Drunk & Deadly: A Day on America's Highways (1987) - Directed by Robert Niemack
Murder or Mercy: Five American Families (1988) - Directed by Terry Dunn Meurer
Execution: Fourteen Days in May (1988) - Directed by Paul Hamann
Confessions of an Undercover Cop (1988) - Directed by Chris Jeans
Warning: Medicine May Be Hazardous to Your Health (1988) - Directed by Veronica L. Young
Why Did Johnny Kill? (1988) - Directed by Robert Niemack
Transplant (1988) - Directed by Vincent Stafford
Into Madness (1989) - Directed by Susan Raymond
Battered (1989) - Directed by Lee Grant
Crack USA: County Under Siege (1989) - Directed by Vince DiPersio and Bill Guttentag
One Year in a Life of Crime (1989) - Directed by Jon Alpert
Convicts on the Street: One Year on Parole (1990) - Directed by Robert Niemack
Doing Time: Life Inside the Big House (1991) - Directed by Alan Raymond
Rape: Cries from the Heartland (1991) - Directed by Maryann DeLeo
Attempted Murder: Confrontation (1991) - Directed by Tom Spain
Death on the Job (1991) - Directed by Vince DiPersio and Bill Guttentag
The Iceman Tapes: Conversations with a Killer (1992) - Directed by Arthur Ginsberg and Tom Spain
Suicide Notes (1992) - Directed by Robert Niemack
Asylum (1992) - Directed by Joan Churchill
Abortion: Desperate Choices (1992) - Directed by Deborah Dickson, Susan Froemke, and Albert Maysles
My Mother's Murder (1992) - Directed by Charles C. Stuart
Never Say Die: The Search for Eternal Youth (1992) - Directed by Antony Thomas
Women on Trial (1992) - Directed by Lee Grant
I Am a Promise: The Children of Stanton Elementary School (1993)
Gang War: Bangin' In Little Rock (1994)
 High on Crack Street: Lost Lives in Lowell  (1995) - Directed by Jon Alpert, Maryann DeLeo and Richard Farrell
The Celluloid Closet (1995)
Fetishes (1996) - Directed by Nick Broomfield
Dragtime (1997) - Directed by Patti Kaplan
Bellevue: Inside Out (2001) - Directed by Maryann DeLeo
Blue Vinyl (2002)
My Flesh and Blood (2003)
Shelter Dogs (2003)
Middle Sexes: Redefining He and She (2005)
Dealing Dogs (2006)

References

External links

HBO original programming
1983 American television series debuts
2006 American television series endings
1980s American documentary television series
1990s American documentary television series
2000s American documentary television series
English-language television shows